Elections for Croydon Council in London were held on 6 May 2010.  The 2010 United Kingdom General Election and other local elections took place on the same day.

In London council elections the entire council is elected every four years, as opposed to some local elections where one councillor is elected every year in three of the four years.

An election petition was lodged against the result in the Waddon ward, concerning allegations that not all voters who wished to vote on election day were allowed to vote.  The case, supported by the Electoral Commission as a test case, was later withdrawn at the High Court

Overall results

|}

Ward Results

Addiscombe

Ashburton

Bensham Manor

Broad Green

Coulsdon East

Coulsdon West

Croham

Fairfield

Fieldway

Heathfield

Kenley

New Addington

Norbury

Purley

Sanderstead

Selhurst

Selsdon & Ballards

South Norwood

Shirley

Thornton Heath

Upper Norwood

Waddon

West Thornton

Woodside

Elected by ward

References

2010
2010 London Borough council elections
May 2010 events in the United Kingdom